The Safeguarding of Industries Act 1921 (11 & 12 Geo. V c. 47) was an Act passed by the British Parliament which safeguarded certain key industries.

Part I of the Act put a five-year duty of 33.3% ad valorem on nine categories of items (including optical glass, laboratory porcelain, hosiery latch needles, metallic tungsten, synthetic chemicals) that were perceived as being essential to British success in the Great War. Part II of the Act put a similar duty on imported goods which were sold at prices below the cost of production (dumping) or at prices lower than the prices of similar goods profitably made in Britain, due to depreciating currencies of the imported goods' country of origin. In the House of Commons 142 voted for its third reading, which was passed by 178 votes to 56.

Notes

Further reading
F. W. Hirst, Safeguarding and Protection in Great Britain and the United States (London, 1927).

United Kingdom Acts of Parliament 1921
Economic history of the United Kingdom